"The Breakup Song" is a song by American Christian singer and songwriter Francesca Battistelli. It was released on June 15, 2018. The song peaked at No. 6 on the Hot Christian Songs chart, becoming her 11th top 10 single from that chart.

Background 
On June 15, 2018, Battistelli released "The Breakup Song". It was co-written by MercyMe’s Bart Millard and writer/producer David Garcia, who worked with the acts such as Bebe Rexha, Florida Georgia Line, and TobyMac. The song is not about the end of a relationship but breaking away from fear. Battistelli spoke on her new single to JFH News, "Fear is a universal struggle. We all deal with it in different ways, but it holds us back from truly living. I came to the point where I decided I wanted it out of my life for good. This song is my anthem, and I pray it encourages others to break up with fear too." She performed the single the same day on "Today In Nashville."

Music video
A music video for "The Breakup Song" was released on June 16, 2018.

Charts

Weekly charts

Year-end charts

References

2018 songs
2018 singles
Francesca Battistelli songs
Songs written by Bart Millard
Songs written by David Garcia (musician)
Song recordings produced by Ian Eskelin
Songs written by Francesca Battistelli